The Krainke is a river of Mecklenburg-Vorpommern and Lower Saxony, Germany. It flows into the Sude near Besitz.

See also
List of rivers of Mecklenburg-Vorpommern
List of rivers of Lower Saxony

References

Rivers of Mecklenburg-Western Pomerania
Rivers of Lower Saxony
Rivers of Germany